Daniel Rogan Morse (born 1944) is an American Anglican bishop currently serving as bishop ordinary of the Reformed Episcopal Church's Diocese of the Central States.

Biography
Morse was married for 48 years to Marianne Porcher McCravey (1944–2015). They had four children. Morse was rector of Immanuel Church in Germantown, Tennessee. He also served as a convocation dean, standing committee member and dean of the external studies program at Cummins Theological Seminary.

In 1996, Morse was elected assistant bishop in the newly formed Diocese of Mid-America, which combined the Synod of Chicago and the eastern part of the Special Jurisdiction for North America. He was consecrated by Leonard W. Riches in Memphis, Tennessee, in August 1996.

After 12 years of serving in the Diocese of Mid-America, Morse was elected the first bishop ordinary of the Missionary Diocese of the Central States, taking office in January 2008. In 2013, the DCS was given full status as an REC and Anglican Church in North America diocese.

In 2016, Morse called for the election of a bishop coadjutor to succeed him upon retirement, and suffragan bishop Peter Manto was elected. At the end of 2019, Morse formally retired and was succeeded as bishop ordinary by Manto.

References

Living people
Bishops of the Anglican Church in North America
20th-century Anglican bishops in the United States
Bishops of the Reformed Episcopal Church
1944 births